The Women's Territorial Tournament was a women's cricket competition organised by the Women's Cricket Association that ran from 1988 until 1994. It operated predominantly as a 55-over limited overs cricket competition, with 4 regional teams playing each other in a round robin format.

The tournament followed the Women's Area Championship and the teams playing in the Territorial Tournament were selected from players playing in the Area Championship. Teams in the Territorial Tournament were regionalised, comprising players from two or three Championship teams. 

North Women were the most successful side in the history of the Territorial Tournament, winning four titles. Midwest Women won the other two titles, whilst there was no winner in 1991 as only two 3-day matches were played.

History
The inaugural Territorial Tournament took place in 1988, following the 1988 Women's Area Championship and was won by North, winning all three of their games. North went on to be the most successful side in the Territorial Tournament, winning four titles, reflecting the simultaneous success of Yorkshire in the Area Championship, from which they drew many of their players. Midwest were the only other side to win the tournament, topping the table in 1989 and 1992. The tournament was played using a 55-over format in all years but one, 1991. In 1991, the tournament was instead made up of two 3-day matches, East v Midwest and North v South. Midwest beat East by 10 wickets, whilst the match between North and South was drawn. 

The tournament's final season was in 1994 after which it was discontinued. The Area Championship was discontinued after the 1996 season, and was replaced by the Women's County Championship. The regional teams did survive however, and played warm-up games against touring international sides and for the 1993 Women's Cricket World Cup.

Teams
Teams in the Territorial Tournament were regionalised, made up of a combination of teams that played in the Women's Area Championship. The teams that competed were:

Winners

See also
 Women's Area Championship
 Women's County Championship

References

English domestic cricket competitions
Women's cricket competitions in England
Recurring sporting events established in 1988
1988 establishments in England
Recurring sporting events disestablished in 1994
1994 disestablishments in England